Chiautempan Municipality is one of the municipalities of Tlaxcala, Mexico.

External links
Ayuntamiento Chiautempan Official website

Municipalities of Tlaxcala